Townley Run is a  long tributary to West Branch French Creek that is classed as a 1st order stream on the EPA waters geoviewer site.

Course
Townley Run rises in Greenfield Township of eastern Erie County, Pennsylvania and then flows southeast to meet West Branch French Creek southwest of Little Hope, Pennsylvania.

Watershed
Townley Run drains  of Erie Drift Plain (glacial geology).  The watershed receives an average of 47.0 in/year of precipitation and has a wetness index of 484.45.  The watershed is about 53% forested.

References

Rivers of Pennsylvania
Tributaries of the Allegheny River
Rivers of Erie County, Pennsylvania